The 2011–12 season is Fenerbahçe's 54th consecutive season in the Süper Lig and their 104th year in existence.

However, on 24 August 2011, the Turkish Football Federation (TFF), under pressure from UEFA in connection with a match-fixing investigation, banned Fenerbahçe from participating in the 2011–12 UEFA Champions League.

Match fixing scandal

In July 2011, as part of a major match-fixing investigation by authorities in Turkey, nearly 60 people suspected to be involved with fixing games were detained by İstanbul Police Department Organized Crime Control Bureau and then arrested by the court. The Turkish football corruption scandal is an ongoing investigation about match-fixing, bribery, starting a gang, organized crime and intimidation in Turkey's top two divisions, the Süper Lig and the First League. 
On 10 July 2011, the club president Aziz Yıldırım was remanded in custody over allegations of match-fixing. On 19 July 2011, the TFF announced that the Turkish Super Cup game between Süper Lig champion Fenerbahçe and Turkish Cup winner Beşiktaş was postponed to an unknown date due to prosecution investigation. 
On 21 July 2011, at the Fenerbahçe-Shakhtar friendly game in İstanbul, Fenerbahçe fans with the full support of Fenerbahçe officials ripped out the seats and threw them onto the Turkish press. Police struggled to gain control for about 40–45 minutes and some cameramen, security officers and Ukrainian press were seriously wounded. Fenerbahçe fans invaded the pitch and threw flares towards security and protested both UEFA and FIFA, yelling that "you cannot relegate Fenerbahçe even if they did match-fixing". After that, the match was cancelled by the referee. According to Turkish Law number 6222 regarding "violence in sports", Article 16: invading the pitch, dressing room or/and corridor will be sentenced to 3 months-1 year in jail. If it seriously collapses the match security, then one will be sentenced to 1–3 years in jail. Article 17: Harming someone on the pitch or/and harming something in the stadium will be punished by Turkish Penal Code.

On 25 July 2011, TFF announced that the Süper Lig was delayed to 9 September 2011 and the TFF First League was postponed to 10 September 2011 due to prosecution investigation. On 28 July, Fenerbahçe declared that Emmanuel Emenike who joined the team 2 months ago from Karabükspor and involved in police investigation of the match-fixing scandal was on the list of transfers due to the possibility of relegation of Fenerbahçe. On the same day, four Fenerbahçe supporters were detained, with four more wanted. After four hours of declaration of Fenerbahçe, Fenerbahçe announced that Emmanuel Emenike was sold to Spartak Moscow.

On 29 July 2011, a third wave of investigation were started and Fenerbahçe official Murat Özaydınlı, Fenerbahçe Administrative Manager Hasan Çetinkaya, İBB Spor player and former Fenerbahçe player Can Arat and former referee and ex-Gençlerbirliği official Zafer Önder İpek were questioned.

On 2 August 2011, a fourth wave of investigation began and Fenerbahçe player Emre Belözoğlu, former Beşiktaş player and journalist Sinan Engin, Ankaragücü player Kaan Söylemezgiller, Manager Ekrem Okumuş and journalist Tahir Kum were questioned.

On 5 August 2011, UEFA Chief Executive Gianni Infantino said "In these uncertain times we must take care to protect our game. Threats from outside the game, including illegal betting and match-fixing, are a cause for real concern. We have seen major incidents in domestic leagues in Turkey, Greece and Italy, where matches remain under investigation. And UEFA is working hard behind the scenes to help rid the game of these threats. We are constantly monitoring all European domestic top league matches, as well as all UEFA matches, for any signs of unusual betting patterns, And to reiterate the warnings made earlier this season, I would like to remind you all that UEFA has a zero tolerance policy towards any involvement in illegal betting or irregular activities connected to our matches.Armed with new, tougher disciplinary regulations, we will not hesitate to investigate and prosecute any individual or any club that is caught. It is important that we face this threat to our game together and act quickly and decisively in order to deal with the issue."

On 15 August 2011, the TFF announced that they had deferred a decision on possible sanctions for the clubs implicated in a match-fixing scandal until a prosecutor's indictment into the case. However, TFF President said they had arrested 17 people, and 35 people who were under trial without arrest would be referred to the Professional Football Disciplinary Board in the scope of match fixing and incentive pay included in the investigation file. Trabzonspor and Galatasaray reacted to the declaration of TFF and made their statements.

On 17 August 2011, after the declaration of TFF on 15 August, Fenerbahçe gained 49 percent more value per unit share in the stock market. Capital Markets Board of Turkey (SPK) and Istanbul Stock Exchange (İMKB) immediately launched an investigation to see if there had been any manipulation or insider trading behind this unprecedented volatility in the shares. SPK and İMKB specialists were also in contact with İstanbul Prosecutor's office and İstanbul Police Department OCCB.

On 22 August 2011, it was the first time in history that UEFA had sent Chief Inspector of the UEFA Disciplinary Committee Pierre Cornu to meet the prosecutor directly to find out what happened in Turkey. Cornu met Mehmet Berk who is the prosecutor of match-fixing investigation at İstanbul Prosecutor's Office.

On 24 August 2011, the TFF, under pressure from UEFA in connection with the match-fixing investigation, banned Fenerbahçe from participating in the 2011–12 UEFA Champions League.

On the same day, UEFA announced that the Trabzonspor-Athletic Bilbao game was cancelled. UEFA decided to replace Fenerbahçe with Trabzonspor, runners-up in the 2010–11 Süper Lig. UEFA General Secretary Gianni Infantino said: "The panel considered that the Turkish Football Federation took the right decision to protect the game, fully in line with our zero-tolerance policy against match-fixing. The Turkish Football Federation has shown with this decision that it takes its full responsibility in the fight against corruption."

On 25 August 2011, Fenerbahçe Deputy President Nihat Özdemir resigned as deputy president and all other duties assigned, due to UEFA's 24 August 2011 statement. Fenerbahçe President Aziz Yıldırım, who is in jail, also resigned as president of the Süper Lig Teams Organization. The Arbitration Board of TFF rejected Fenerbahçe's appeal regarding admission to Champions League.

On 26 August 2011, UEFA President Michel Platini said "Match-fixing scandals have badly tarnished the game recently, with Turkish champions Fenerbahçe this week withdrawn from the Champions League amid investigations into allegations in that country. If you have match-fixing and the result of the game is known before it is played, what is the point of going to the match, or reporting it?"

On 6 September 2011, UEFA President Michel Platini said "Don't you really know why Fenerbahçe couldn't join the UEFA Champions League? The investigation is still going on. When it's completed, everybody knows everything in details. However, it is certain that it won't be good for Turkish football anymore."

On 9 September 2011, TFF President Mehmet Ali Aydınlar declared that they had changed their decision of 15 August 2011's statement and would make a decision regarding the previous season at the end of the 2011–12 season, whereas they already announced that they deferred a decision on possible sanctions for the clubs implicated in a match-fixing scandal until a prosecutor's indictment into the case.

On 26 September 2011, in Italy, Naples prosecutor Rosario Cantelmo announced that he had discovered illegal betting activities in the Fenerbahçe – MTK Budapest match on 30 July 2008.

On 25 January 2012, UEFA Chief Executive Gianni Infantino declared, "I think it is important that the TFF is taking decisions, the right decisions, with regards to this whole match-fixing situation. The disciplinary proceedings from the sporting side, they need to go fast, because it is important that the integrity and regularity of the competition is guaranteed as soon as possible."

On 26 January 2012, General Convention of TFF, which consists of Turkish clubs, rejected a federation proposal to spare clubs from possible relegation over a match-fixing scandal.

Kits
Fenerbahçe's 2011–12 kits were introduced on 15 July 2011 on fenerbahce.org and produced by Adidas. The home kit's name is Çubuklu Forma, which means "barred ki"; the away kit's name is Tek Yıldız Forma, which means "one star kit"; the third kit's name is Altın Zırh Forma, which means "golden armor kit"; and the fourth kit's name is Sarı Kanarya Forma, which means "yellow canary kit".

Supplier: Adidas
Main sponsor: Avea

Back sponsor: Ülker
Sleeve sponsor: Türk Telekom

Short sponsor:
Socks sponsor:

Transfers

In

Total spending:  €34.55 million

Out

Total income:  €27.5 million

Line-up 

4–2–3–1 Formation

Current squad
Updated 27 January 2012.

Out on Loan

Squad statistics

Club

The Board of Directors

Technical staff

Medical staff

Pre-season friendlies

Competitions

Overall

Süper Kupa

Süper Lig

League table

Results summary

Results by round

Matches

Süper Final

Final table

Final results summary

Final results by round

Final matches

Türkiye Kupası

UEFA Champions League

Fenerbahçe was suspended by the TFF on 24 August 2011 from participating in the 2011–12 UEFA Champions League due to an ongoing investigation into match-fixing allegations. The club was replaced in the competition with Trabzonspor.

Top scorers

See also

2011 Süper Kupa
2011–12 Süper Lig
2011–12 Türkiye Kupası
2011–12 UEFA Champions League
2011 Turkish football corruption scandal

References

Fenerbahçe S.K. (football) seasons
Fenerbahce